No. 7 Brick Row is a 1922 British silent crime film directed by Fred W. Durrant and starring Constance Worth, Marjorie Villis and James Knight.

Cast
 Constance Worth as Daisy Knox  
 Marjorie Villis as Gertie Mellor  
 James Knight as Dr. James Peacock  
 Bernard Dudley as Bertram Lycester  
 H. Tyrrell-Davis as Sam Mundy  
 Marguerite Leigh as Mrs. Tickle  
 George A. Williams as Caleb Knox  
 Johnny Butt as Sooty Bill  
 Sydney Lewis Ransome as Sergeant Smith  
 Edith Morley as Maud Annie Tickle 
 Marie d'Andara as Cissie Tickle  
 Greta Wood as Louisa

References

Bibliography
 Low, Rachael. History of the British Film, 1918-1929. George Allen & Unwin, 1971.

External links
 

1922 films
1922 crime films
British crime films
British silent feature films
Films set in England
British black-and-white films
1920s English-language films
1920s British films
Silent crime films